Adam Artur Żmudziński (born 18 January 1956) is a Polish bridge player. After 2014 competition, he ranked 22nd among Grand Masters by World Bridge Federation (WBF) masterpoints, five places behind his longtime partner Cezary Balicki. They ranked 26–27th among more than 100 all-time Grand Masters by placing points that do not decay over time.

Żmudziński won the World Transnational Open Teams in 2000 and 2009, European Open Teams in 1989 and 1993 as well as the London Sunday Times Invitational Pairs in 1994. His team finished second in the 2000 World Team Olympiad, 1991 Bermuda Bowl and 1994 Rosenblum Cup. With his regular partner, Cezary Balicki, won the bronze medal at the World Open Pairs held in Geneva in 1990.

On 26 September 2015, the World Bridge Federation Credentials Committee announced that the invitation extended to Balicki and Żmudziński to play in the 2015 Bermuda Bowl in Chennai, India had been withdrawn, one day before play was due to start. No reason was given.

On 22 June 2017, the Disciplinary Department of the Polish Bridge Federation (PZBS) recognised as an indisputable fact that Balicki and Żmudziński engaged in illegal transmission of information during the European Bridge League Championship in Opatija in 2014. The disciplinary department did not impose any penalties due to the expiry of the limitation period.

Bridge accomplishments

Wins

 North American Bridge Championships (13)
 Roth Open Swiss Teams (1) 2013 
 Vanderbilt (2) 2001, 2007 
 Keohane North American Swiss Teams (2) 2009, 2014 
 Mitchell Board-a-Match Teams (4) 2000, 2005, 2009, 2010 
 Roth Open Swiss Teams (1) 2006 
 Spingold (3) 1997, 2003, 2008

Runners-up

 North American Bridge Championships (11)
 Jacoby Open Swiss Teams (1) 1999 
 Roth Open Swiss Teams (1) 2012 
 Vanderbilt (1) 2006 
 Senior Knockout Teams (2) 2013, 2014 
 Mitchell Board-a-Match Teams (2) 2004, 2007 
 Reisinger (2) 1997, 2003 
 Spingold (2) 1998, 2007

Notes

References

External links
 
 

1956 births
Polish contract bridge players
Bermuda Bowl players
Living people
Place of birth missing (living people)